Barker General Store is a historic general store located at Beecher Hollow in Saratoga County, New York.  The main block was constructed in 1847 and is a -story, gable-roofed rectangular building.  A 2-story, shed-roofed addition was added in 1870.  It features a tall portico supported by four Tuscan order turned wood columns.  It is an example of transitional Federal / Greek Revival commercial architecture.  A concealed area is believed to have served as a hiding place for escaped slaves being transported on the Underground Railroad.

It was listed on the National Register of Historic Places in 2002.

References

Underground Railroad locations
Commercial buildings on the National Register of Historic Places in New York (state)
Federal architecture in New York (state)
Greek Revival architecture in New York (state)
Commercial buildings completed in 1847
Buildings and structures in Saratoga County, New York
1847 establishments in New York (state)
National Register of Historic Places in Saratoga County, New York
General stores in the United States